is a Japanese slice of life seinen manga series written and illustrated by panpanya. It was published by 1月と7月 (ichigatsu to shichigatsu) on August 30, 2013. Other of the author's works have been published in the United States, in English, by Denpa.

Reception
It was number fourteen on the 2014 Kono Manga ga Sugoi! Top 20 Manga for Male Readers survey. It was also nominated for the 7th Manga Taishō, receiving 31 points and placing 9th among the ten nominees.

References

2013 manga
Action anime and manga
Slice of life anime and manga